The 2020 European Rowing Championships were held in Poznań, Poland from 9 to 11 October 2020.

Medal summary

Men

Women

Mixed para-events

Medal table

References

European Rowing Championships
2020
Rowing competitions in Poland
European Rowing Championships
Sport in Poznań